The Massacre Of Villages Under Kamešnica (Croatian: Pokolj u potkamešničkim selima) was the mass murder of Croat inhabitants from several villages in the Dalmatian Hinterland, between the Kamešnica and Mosor mountains, committed by the German 7th SS Division "Prinz Eugen" from the 26-30 March 1944, during World War II.

Incident 
It happened during the counter-insurgency operations German forces and their Ustasha allies (namely the 369th Infantry Division, under German command) launched against Partisans in the areas of the Mosor mountain. While Partisans forces managed to retreat, German forces pursued them into the Kamešnica valley, where they conducted a punitive expedition against the civilian population, suspected of harbouring Partisans. The operation began on March 26th 1944. The worst hit were areas near Trilj, namely the villages of Podi, Ruda, Otok, Voštane, Krivodol, Donji Dolac, Ljut and Rože. Villagers, mostly women, children and elderly, were shot or forced into houses, which were then set alight. Donji Dolac was the first village to be assaulted, 272 inhabitants were burned alive, including 103 children. The village of Voštane sustained the largest death toll, where between 300 and 400 civilians were killed.

It is estimated that at least 1,525 civilians were killed during the massacres. Other sources, based on reports given by Croatian, Partisan and Wehrmacht reports at the time, estimate that between 1,800 and 3,000 people may have been killed.

References

Massacres committed by Nazi Germany
Massacres in 1944
Modern history of Croatia
1944 in Croatia
Mass murder in 1944
Massacres in the Independent State of Croatia
Massacres of Croats